Bellarine is a rural locality in the City of Greater Geelong, Victoria, Australia. In the 2011 census, the population of Bellarine was too low to separately report; however in June 2014 the Victorian Electoral Commission recorded 134 enrolled voters in Bellarine, living in 81 properties.

History

The area was occupied by squatters from the late 1830s, and was initially known as East Bellarine to distinguish it from Drysdale, which was then known as Bellarine. A Free Presbyterian Church School opened in 1854, and was replaced by a new Presbyterian school in 1861. A Church of England (Anglican) school opened in 1855, closed in 1862 (though was used as a church for some years thereafter), and reopened in 1873. A mechanics' institute was established in 1858 and accumulated a library, though it was forced to share space with the Presbyterian school until its own building was erected in 1870.

East Bellarine Post Office opened on 1 June 1859, with the initial postmaster being C. H. Streeton, father of artist Arthur Streeton, and was renamed Bellarine on 16 January 1865. A Wesleyan Methodist Church was erected in 1865. The Farmers' Arms Hotel operated at the Avondale homestead around 1870, and a Cobb and Co. coach station was also located there. East Bellarine Cricket Club operated from 1871 to 1873, when it amalgamated with the Portarlington club to form the Bellarine Cricket Club. In 1873, Bellarine was reported to have a rural store, post office and blacksmith's shop. One church school was taken over by the Education Department in 1873 as Bellarine East State School No. 231, with the Church of England school taken over in 1874 as Bellarine State School No. 1415. A new Bellarine State School was built and opened in 1877, and Bellarine East State School closed in 1892. A Methodist Sunday School and Church Hall was built in 1894.

Bellarine Post Office closed on 27 April 1979, and Bellarine Primary School has also closed; its closure date is unknown, but the site has been subdivided and sold. The "Avondale" residence, which was the former "Farmers' Arms Hotel", survives, as does the former Wesleyan Methodist Church and the Methodist Sunday School and Church Hall (now the Uniting Church Hall).

Spray Farm

Spray Farm, a historic rural property and one of the earliest farms on the Bellarine Peninsula, is located at Bellarine. It dates from 1851 and is listed on the Victorian Heritage Register and the Register of the National Estate. The property was bought in 1994 by the Browne family, owners of the adjacent Scotchman's Hill Vineyard, who renovated the property in 1998 and operated it as a function centre and concert venue. Among many concerts held there during this period, Spray Farm hosted the major Day on the Green music festival for nine years. The property was bought for A$7.5 million in 2010 by horsebreeder Rick Jamieson, and subsequently renovated and returned to being a private house. It was sold again in March 2014 to Australia and New Zealand Banking Group CEO Mike Smith for an undisclosed amount; the property had been advertised at A$12 million.

Bellarine today

Bellarine remains largely rural. It  contains several wineries, vineyards, stud farms and restaurants; the Terindah Estate, Scotchman's Hill, Bellarine Estate, and Jack Rabbit Vineyard (formerly Kilgour Estate) wineries are located there. Arlington Park Stud and the nearby Greenhills are two well-known horse-training  and breeding parks in the area. The locality also contains the live music venue Harvester Moon, The Shed restaurant at the Terindah Estate, the Bellarine Brewing Company and the Angasi bar and grill at the Bellarine Estate, and the Jack Rabbit Restaurant.

References 

Suburbs of Geelong
Towns in Victoria (Australia)
Bellarine Peninsula